Dwór  is a settlement in the administrative district of Gmina Bielsk Podlaski, within Bielsk County, Podlaskie Voivodeship, in north-eastern Poland. The etymology of its name means manor house.

References

Villages in Bielsk County